Sirka Sirka (Aymara sirka vein of a mine, the reduplication indicates that there is a complex of something, "many veins", Hispanicized spelling Cercacerca) is a  mountain in the Peruvian Andes, about  high. It is located in the Moquegua Region, Mariscal Nieto Province, Carumas District, and in the Puno Region, Puno Province, Acora District. It lies southeast of Q'iwiri.

References

Mountains of Moquegua Region
Mountains of Puno Region
Mountains of Peru